Breaking Up Is Hard to Do is a 2010 American romantic comedy film directed and co-written by Tabari Sturdivant.

Premise 
Vince and Shonda agree to go into therapy in a last ditch effort to restore their love for one another.

Cast 
Demetria McKinney as Shonda
Kendrick Cross as Vince
Dawn Halfkenny as Tasha

References

External links

American political films
2010 films
2010 romantic comedy films
American romantic comedy films
2010s English-language films
2010s American films